Laverne Cox (born May 29, 1972) is an American actress and LGBT advocate. She rose to prominence with her role as Sophia Burset on the Netflix series Orange Is the New Black, becoming the first transgender person to be nominated for a Primetime Emmy Award in an acting category, and the first to be nominated for an Emmy Award since composer Angela Morley in 1990. In 2015, she won a Daytime Emmy Award in Outstanding Special Class Special as executive producer for Laverne Cox Presents: The T Word, making her the first trans woman to win the award. In 2017, she became the first transgender person to play a transgender series regular on U.S. broadcast TV as Cameron Wirth on CBSs Doubt.

Cox appeared as a contestant on the first season of VH1's reality show I Want to Work for Diddy, and co-produced and co-hosted the VH1 makeover television series TRANSform Me. In April 2014, Cox was honored by GLAAD with its Stephen F. Kolzak Award for her work as an advocate for the transgender community. In June 2014, Cox became the first transgender person to appear on the cover of Time magazine. Cox is the first transgender person to appear on the cover of a Cosmopolitan magazine, with her February 2018 cover on the South African edition. She is also the first openly transgender person to have a wax figure of herself at Madame Tussauds.

Early life
Cox was born in Mobile, Alabama, and was raised by a single mother and grandmother within the AME Zion church. She has an identical twin brother, M Lamar, who portrayed the pre-transitioning Sophia (as Marcus) in Orange Is the New Black. Cox has stated that she attempted suicide at the age of 11, when she noticed that she had developed feelings for her male classmates and had been bullied for several years for not acting "the way someone assigned male at birth was supposed to act".

She is a graduate of the Alabama School of Fine Arts in Birmingham, Alabama, where she studied creative writing before switching to dance. She then studied for two years at Indiana University Bloomington before transferring to Marymount Manhattan College in New York City, where she switched from dancing (specifically classical ballet) to acting. During her first season on Orange Is the New Black, she was still appearing at a restaurant on the Lower East Side as a drag queen (where she had applied initially to work as a waitress).

Career

Cox appeared as a contestant on the first season of I Want to Work for Diddy; afterwards she was approached by VH1 about show ideas. From that came the makeover television series TRANSform Me, which made Cox the first African-American transgender person to produce and star in her own TV show. Both those shows were nominated for a GLAAD Media Award for outstanding reality program, and when Diddy won in 2009, Cox accepted the award at the ceremony, giving a speech described by the San Francisco Sentinel as "among the most poignant because [it] reminded us how important it is to tell our stories, all of our stories." She has also acted in a number of TV shows and films, including Law & Order: Special Victims Unit, Bored to Death, and Musical Chairs.

In 2013, Cox began her recurring role in the Netflix series Orange is the New Black as Sophia Burset, a trans woman sent to prison for credit-card fraud. In that year, she stated, "Sophia is written as a multi-dimensional character who the audience can really empathize with—all of the sudden they're empathizing with a real Trans person. And for Trans folks out there, who need to see representations of people who are like them and of their experiences, that's when it becomes really important." Cox's role in Orange is the New Black provides her a platform to speak on the rights of trans people.

In January 2014, Cox joined trans woman Carmen Carrera on Katie Couric's syndicated show, Katie. Couric referred to transgender people as "transgenders", and after being rebuffed by Carrera on the subject of her surgeries, specifically what genital reconstruction she had done, turned the same question to Cox. Cox responded,

News outlets such as Salon, The Huffington Post, and Business Insider covered what was characterized by Salon writer Katie McDonough as Couric's "clueless" and "invasive" line of questioning.

Cox was on the cover of the June 9, 2014, issue of Time and was interviewed for the article "The Transgender Tipping Point" by Katy Steinmetz, which ran in that issue and the title of which was also featured on the cover; this makes Cox the first transgender person on the cover of Time.

Later in 2014, Cox became the first transgender person to be nominated for a Primetime Emmy Award in an acting category: Outstanding Guest Actress in a Comedy Series for her role as Sophia Burset in Orange Is the New Black. She also appeared in John Legend's video for the song "You & I (Nobody in the World)".

Cox joined a campaign in 2014 against a Phoenix, Arizona, law which allows police to arrest anyone suspected of "manifesting prostitution", and which she feels targets transgender women of color, following the conviction of activist (and transgender woman of color) Monica Jones. Cox stated, "All over the country, trans women are targeted simply for being who they are. Laws like this manifestation law really support systematically the idea that girls like me, girls like me and Monica, are less than [others] in this country." Later that year the Sylvia Rivera Law Project released a video in which Cox read a letter from transgender inmate Synthia China Blast, addressing common issues faced by trans inmates. But when Cox learned that Blast was found guilty of the 1993 rape and murder of a 13-year-old child, she wrote on her Tumblr, "I was not aware of the charges for which she was convicted. If I had been aware of those charges, I would have never agreed to read the letter."

Cox was featured in the annual "Rebels" issue of V in late 2014. For the issue, V asked celebrities and artists to nominate who they saw as their personal rebels, and Natasha Lyonne nominated Cox. Cox was also on the cover of the October 2014 issue of Essence magazine, along with actresses Alfre Woodard, Nicole Beharie, and Danai Gurira.

On October 17, 2014, Laverne Cox Presents: The T Word, an hour-long documentary executive-produced and narrated by Cox, premiered on MTV and Logo simultaneously. That same year, Cox was featured on the fifth anniversary cover of C☆NDY magazine along with 13 other transgender women – Janet Mock, Carmen Carrera, Geena Rocero, Isis King, Gisele Alicea, Leyna Ramous, Dina Marie, Nina Poon, Juliana Huxtable, Niki M'nray, Pêche Di, Carmen Xtravaganza (House of Xtravaganza), and Yasmine Petty.

In 2015, Cox won a Daytime Emmy Award in Outstanding Special Class Special as Executive Producer for Laverne Cox Presents: The T Word. This made Cox the first transgender woman to win a Daytime Emmy as an Executive Producer; as well, The T Word is the first trans documentary to win a Daytime Emmy. That year Cox, among others, posed nude for the Allure annual "Nudes" issue, becoming the first transgender actress to do so.

Cox is the cover subject for the June 11, 2015, "totally not-straight issue" of Entertainment Weekly, the first issue of the magazine in 15 years to focus exclusively on gay, lesbian, and transgender entertainment.

In June 2016, the Human Rights Campaign released a video in tribute to the victims of the Orlando nightclub shooting; in the video, Cox and others told the stories of the people killed there.

In 2017, Cox began her role as transgender attorney Cameron Wirth on Doubt on CBS. However, after only two episodes had aired, CBS announced that they were pulling the series from their schedule, leaving the future of the remaining unaired episodes uncertain. It was the first official cancellation of the 2016–17 season, following weak viewership. CBS later announced that the remaining 11 episodes would be broadcast on Saturday, beginning July 1.

Cox was nominated in 2017 for a Primetime Emmy Award for Outstanding Guest Actress in a Drama Series for her role in Orange Is the New Black.

Also in 2017, Cox collaborated with the ACLU, Zackary Drucker, Molly Crabapple, and Kim Boekbinder, in making a video about transgender history and resistance, called "Time Marches Forward & So Do We", which Cox narrated. That year Cox became one of the four faces of the fall campaign for the Ivy Park line of clothing.

In February 2019, Cox headlined the New York Fashion Week show for 11 Honoré, a luxury e-retailer focused on plus-sized designer fashion.

Cox was featured in Taylor Swift's "You Need to Calm Down" music video, which was released June 17, 2019.

She was one of fifteen women chosen by guest editor Meghan, Duchess of Sussex, to appear on the cover of the September 2019 issue of British Vogue; this made Cox the first transgender woman to appear on the cover of British Vogue.

In September 2019, Cox brought ACLU attorney Chase Strangio as her date to the 2019 Emmy Awards, and carried a custom rainbow clutch featuring the phrases "Oct 8", "Title VII", and "Supreme Court". This action was in reference to the U.S. Supreme Court case R.G. & G.R. Harris Funeral Homes Inc. v. Equal Employment Opportunity Commission, in which Strangio was one of the lawyers representing Aimee Stephens, a trans woman who was fired from her job at a funeral home. Cox and Strangio spoke to reporters on the red carpet about the upcoming court case. Cox executive produced the documentary Disclosure: Trans Lives on Screen, which premiered on Netflix on January 27, 2020.

In May 2021, E! announced that Cox would become the host of Live from the Red Carpet starting in January 2022, replacing Giuliana Rancic. In December 2021, she was cast in Netflix's dystopian fantasy film Uglies directed by McG, based on a book of the same name by Scott Westerfeld.

Impact 
Cox has been noted by her LGBT peers, and many others, for being a trailblazer for the transgender community, and has won numerous awards for her activist approach in spreading awareness. Her impact and prominence in the media has led to a growing conversation about transgender culture, specifically transgender women, and how being transgender intersects with one's race. She is the first transgender person to be on the cover of Time magazine, be nominated for a Primetime Emmy, and have a wax work in Madame Tussauds, as well as the first transgender woman to win a Daytime Emmy as an executive producer. In May 2016, Cox was awarded an Honorary Doctorate from The New School in New York City for her progressive work in the fight for gender equality.

Honors and awards
 2013 – Anti-Violence Project 2013 Courage Award honoree
 2013 – Reader's Choice Award at Out Magazines OUT100 Gala, honoring the magazine's selection of 2013's 100 "most compelling people of the year".
 2014 – Woman of the Year by Glamour magazine.
 2014 – Included in the annual Root 100; this list honors "standout black leaders, innovators and culture shapers" aged 45 and younger.
 2014 – Topped the British newspaper The Guardians third annual World Pride Power List, which ranks the world's most influential LGBT people.
 2014 – Stephen F. Kolzak Award from GLAAD.
 2014 – Named to the EBONY Power 100 list.
 2015 – Named to the 2015 OUT Power 50 List.
 2015 – Included in the People World's Most Beautiful Women List.
 2015 – Three Twins Ice Cream in San Francisco renamed its chocolate orange confetti ice cream Laverne Cox's Chocolate Orange is the New Black for Pride weekend.
 2015 – Named in the 2015 Time 100 Most Influential People List; her entry was written by Jazz Jennings.
 2015 – Named by Forum for Equality as one of their 31 Icons of the LGBT History Month.
 2015 – Winner of a Daytime Emmy Award in Outstanding Special Class Special as Executive Producer for Laverne Cox Presents: The T Word. This made Cox the first transgender woman to win a Daytime Emmy as an Executive Producer; as well, The T Word is the first trans documentary to win a Daytime Emmy.
 2016 – Awarded Honorary Doctorate from The New School.
 2017 – Named to the 2017 OUT Power 50 List.
 2018 – Received the Claire Skiffington Vanguard Award from Transgender Law Center. The award recognizes transgender community members who have been part of the movement's vanguard.
 2022 – Received the W. E. B. Du Bois Medal from the Hutchins Center for African and African American Research at Harvard University.

Filmography

Film

Television

Discography

Soundtrack albums

Singles

See also
 LGBT culture in New York City
 List of LGBT people from New York City

References

Further reading

External links

 
 
 Interview with Laverne Cox  (video)
 

1972 births
21st-century American actresses
Actors from Mobile, Alabama
Actresses from Alabama
African-American actresses
American film actresses
American television actresses
American voice actresses
Daytime Emmy Award winners
Identical twin actresses
Indiana University Bloomington alumni
LGBT African Americans
American LGBT actors
LGBT people from Alabama
American LGBT rights activists
LGBT film producers
Living people
Marymount Manhattan College alumni
Transgender actresses
Transgender rights activists
American twins
African-American feminists
Women civil rights activists
21st-century African-American women
21st-century African-American people
20th-century African-American people
20th-century African-American women